C.H. Star is an Eritrean football club (as of 2001) based in Asmara.

Current squad

References

Football clubs in Eritrea
Organisations based in Asmara